Adam Stachowiak (born 10 July 1989) is a Polish racing cyclist, who currently rides for UCI Continental team . He rode at the 2014 UCI Road World Championships.

Major results

2013
 8th Overall Czech Cycling Tour
 9th Overall Szlakiem Grodów Piastowskich
2014
 1st Mountains classification Tour of Małopolska
 2nd Coupe des Carpathes
 6th Overall Course de la Solidarité Olympique
 6th Race Horizon Park 2
 10th Overall Memorial Grundmanna I Wizowskiego
2015
 1st Memorial Grundmanna I Wizowskiego
 4th Visegrad 4 Bicycle Race – GP Polski
 5th Overall Szlakiem Grodów Piastowskich
 6th Sochi Cup
 7th Grand Prix of Sochi Mayor
 10th Overall Grand Prix of Sochi
2016
 4th Overall Bałtyk–Karkonosze Tour
 8th Overall Szlakiem Grodów Piastowskich
2017
 3rd Overall Bałtyk–Karkonosze Tour
 3rd Overall Course de la Solidarité Olympique
 3rd Visegrad 4 Bicycle Race – Kerékpárverseny
 4th Overall Szlakiem Walk Majora Hubala
 5th Coupe des Carpathes
 6th Overall Tour of Małopolska
1st Mountains classification
2018
 4th Overall Bałtyk–Karkonosze Tour
 5th Overall Course de la Solidarité Olympique
 10th Overall Szlakiem Walk Majora Hubala
2019
 1st  Overall Tour of Małopolska
1st Stage 3
 3rd Overall Bałtyk–Karkonosze Tour
 8th Memoriał Andrzeja Trochanowskiego
2020
 3rd Overall Bałtyk–Karkonosze Tour
 5th Overall Tour of Małopolska
 8th Overall Tour of Bulgaria
2021
 5th Overall Tour of Małopolska
 5th Overall Tour de Serbie
 9th Overall Szlakiem Grodów Piastowskich

References

External links
 
 

1989 births
Living people
Polish male cyclists
People from Żyrardów
Sportspeople from Masovian Voivodeship